Craig Lee Ludwig (born March 15, 1961) is an American former professional hockey player. He played as a defenceman in the National Hockey League from 1982 to 1999 and was renowned for his shot-blocking ability. Ludwig was the color analyst for the Dallas Stars television and radio broadcasts for two seasons from 2016 to 2018.

Playing career

Amateur
Ludwig played high school hockey at Northland Pines High School in Eagle River, Wisconsin from 1975–1979. He helped the Eagles to the semi-finals in 1978–1979. He played on the USA Hockey National Junior Team that toured Germany in 1979–80. Ludwig went on to attend the University of North Dakota from 1979–1982 as a walk on. He won two National Championships while playing for the Fighting Sioux, alongside other future NHL players James Patrick, Mark Taylor, Doug Smail, Dave Tippett, Rick Zombo, Phil Sykes, Troy Murray, and Jon Casey.

Professional
Ludwig was drafted by the Montreal Canadiens in the 3rd round of the 1980 NHL Entry Draft, 61st overall. He won a Stanley Cup with the team in 1986. In 1990 he was traded to the New York Islanders for Gerald Diduck. After one season with the Isles, Ludwig signed as a free agent with the Minnesota North Stars.

After joining the North Stars in 1991, he moved with the team to Dallas in 1993 and finished his career in 1999 after helping the Dallas Stars win their first Stanley Cup. Ludwig was an alternate captain for the Stars during his time with the team.

Personal 
Ludwig was inducted into the Wisconsin Hockey Hall of Fame in 2002. After his retirement, he worked as an assistant coach for the Utah Grizzlies, Dallas Stars, and Texas Tornado. Three of his sons became professional ice hockey players as well. Trevor and younger son C.J. are currently teammates on the Kansas City Mavericks of the ECHL. C.J. previously played defense for Northern Michigan University. Trevor and his twin brother Tyler were also previously teammates.

Career statistics

Regular season and playoffs

International

Awards and honors

See also
List of NHL players with 1000 games played

References

External links 

Profile at hockeydraftcentral.com
Profile at Wisconsin Hockey Hall of Fame

1961 births
Living people
American men's ice hockey defensemen
Dallas Stars players
Ice hockey people from Wisconsin
Minnesota North Stars players
Montreal Canadiens draft picks
Montreal Canadiens players
New York Islanders players
North Dakota Fighting Hawks men's ice hockey players
People from Rhinelander, Wisconsin
Stanley Cup champions
Dallas Stars announcers
NCAA men's ice hockey national champions
Ice hockey players from Wisconsin